Green Party leadership elections took place in the following countries in 2020:

2020 Green Party of British Columbia leadership election
2020 Green Party of Canada leadership election
2020 Green Party (Czech Republic) leadership election
2020 Green Party of England and Wales leadership election
2020 Green Party leadership election (Ireland)

See also
2020 Green Party presidential primaries in the United States